Lieutenant Alexander Richard Cadell (19 August 1900 – 14 May 1928) was an English cricketer. Cadell was a right-handed batsman who bowled right-arm medium-fast.

Cadell made his first-class debut for the Royal Navy in 1922 against the British Army at Lord's. From 1923 to 1925 Cadell represented the Royal Navy a further three times.

In 1923 Cadell made his County Championship debut for Hampshire, representing them in a single match against Leicestershire.

After nearly a two-year break from first-class cricket, Cadell returned in 1927 to play for the Royal Navy against the touring New Zealanders. 1927 also saw Cadell make a single appearance for the Free Foresters against Oxford University. That same year Cadell made his debut for the Marylebone Cricket Club in two University matches against Oxford University and Cambridge. Cadell played a further two matches that year for the Royal Navy against the Army and the Royal Air Force.

In August 1927 Cadell made his second and final County Championship appearance for Hampshire,  against Warwickshire.

Cadell died on 14 May 1928 from injuries he sustained the previous night in a road traffic accident, succumbing to his injuries at Petersfield Cottage Hospital in Hampshire. Cadell was just 28 when he was killed.

Family
Cadell's great-uncle Vernon Royle represented Lancashire, Oxford University and the Marylebone Cricket Club in first-class cricket. Royle also represented England in a single Test match against Australia at the Melbourne Cricket Ground in 1879.

External links
Alexander Cadell at Cricinfo
Alexander Cadell at CricketArchive
Matches and detailed statistics for Alexander Cadell

1900 births
1928 deaths
Sportspeople from Firozpur
People from Punjab, India
English cricketers
Royal Navy cricketers
Hampshire cricketers
Free Foresters cricketers
Marylebone Cricket Club cricketers
Road incident deaths in England